Vincent Jourdenais (born April 18, 1997) is a Canadian sprint kayaker. Jourdenais started kayaking in 2007, at the age of 10.

Career
At the 2019 ICF Canoe Sprint World Championships Jourdenais and partner Brian Malfesi finished in 14th place in the K-2 1000 metres.

In May 2021, Jourdenais was named to Canada's 2020 Olympic team.

References

1997 births
Canadian male canoeists
Living people
People from Saint-Jean-sur-Richelieu
Sportspeople from Quebec
Canoeists at the 2020 Summer Olympics
Olympic canoeists of Canada